The Godless Americans March on Washington (GAMOW) occurred on the National Mall in Washington, DC, on November 2, 2002, with the participation of many atheists, freethinkers, agnostics and humanists. The public cable network C-SPAN documented the event on video.

Event timeline
The event started at 11:00 am near the Washington Monument, led by the American Atheists' banner promoting the separation of church and state. About halfway down the Mall, the people were confronted by counter-protesters. However, they continued to proceed to the other end of the Mall in front of the Capitol. At 11:30 am, the rally started and featured over 20 speakers and musical entertainment. The rally lasted for about four hours.

Slogans
The event was marked by many slogans and banners on shirts, badges, etc., including "What Our Schools Need is a Moment of Science!", "Atheism is Myth-Understood!", "Secular Humanists for a Secular America" and "Citizen–Atheist–Patriot". The official T-shirt for the march showed a picture of the Capitol and the American flag with the statement "Free, Proud and on the Move–GODLESS AMERICANS".

Speeches
Many speakers delivered speeches at the March. A few noted speakers were Frank Zindler, editor of the American Atheist magazine, Margaret Downey of the Freethought Society of Greater Philadelphia and Ed Buckner, executive director of the Council for Secular Humanism. The speeches delivered were basically on theism, atheism and related themes. Buckner reportedly attacked the way theists perceive atheists as lacking morality.

Aims and objectives

Over two thousand atheists, freethinkers, agnostics and humanists gathered in a mile-long parade down The Mall to rally for several causes, including civil rights, church-state separation and a greater voice in the national political process.

Ellen Johnson, a former president of American Atheists and director of the Godless Americans March On Washington Task Force, announced at the event the formation of the Godless Americans Political Action Committee (GAMPAC), later renamed Enlighten the Vote.

Event speakers
Speakers at the event included:
 Michael Newdow, activist
 Ed Buckner, Executive Director of the Council for Secular Humanism
 Taslima Nasrin, Bangladesh feminist and dissident writer
 Eddie Tabash, California attorney
 Douglas Campbell, Green Party candidate for Governor of Michigan
 August Brunsman, Secular Student Alliance founder
 Michael Rivers, Director of American Atheists in Utah
 Kathleen Johnson, Founder of the Military Association of Atheists & Freethinkers (MAAF), which provided security at the event
 Norm Allen, from the African Americans for Humanism
 Larry Darby, from the Alabama Atheists
 Bobbie Kirkhart from the Atheist Alliance International
 Margaret Downey from the Freethought Society of Greater Philadelphia
 Jim Strayer, from the Atheists of Florida
 John Scalise, from the Great Lakes Humanists
 Harry Greenberger from the New Orleans Secular Humanists
 "Reverend" Chris Harper of the fictitious Landover Baptist Church (also known as Americhrist Ltd.)

Reaction and results

Atheist groups by and large considered the march a success, though some within the atheist community did criticize the event for a number of reasons, including the exclusion of theists from being able to endorse the event, how atheism was defined for the purposes of the march, and the apparent attempt by organizers to use the march as a way of "creating an identity for non-believers".

An organization calling itself the Religious Freedom Coalition ran newspaper advertisements the day before the event characterizing the views of atheists and Satanists to be identical. Following the event, the same organization called the event a success, but described it as "ill timed" and an indication of a dangerous brand of new atheism.

Following the march, leaders of three atheist organizations — Atheist Alliance International, the Institute for Humanist Studies and the Internet Infidels — met and set in motion the founding of the Secular Coalition for America.

Hemant Mehta of the blog the Friendly Atheist and the author of I Sold My Soul on eBay referred to the event in the context of the Reason Rally which was held on Saturday March 24, 2012.

Paul Geisert set up the Brights movement.

References

Religious activism
Atheism in the United States
Religion and politics
Freethought in the United States
2002 in Washington, D.C.
Protest marches in Washington, D.C.
Atheism rallies